HMS Eglinton was a  of the Royal Navy built in 1916. The Racecourse Class (also called the Ascot Class) comprised 32 paddlewheel coastal minesweeping sloops. The vessel was named for Eglinton Racecourse.

References

Racecourse-class minesweepers
1916 ships